Sarwar Imran is a Bangladeshi cricket coach. He was head coach of BKSP (Bangladesh Krira Shikkha Protishtan)from 1987 to 1997.

He started his coaching career in 1984 and from then he played the role of head coach of various teams in premier division cricket, the main domestic ODI competition in Bangladesh. From 2000 to December 2011, he played the role of Head cricket coach of High Performance Unit of Bangladesh National Cricket Academy. Under his coaching, Bangladesh won its first ever gold in 2010 Asian Games.

Imran is only Bangladeshi to have long International Coaching Experience. He was the head coach of Bangladesh National Cricket Team when Bangladesh played its first-ever test match in the year 2000. He was also interim coach in 2003 following the sacking of Mohsin Kamal. Besides that, from 1997 to 2012 Imran was either head or assistant coach of Bangladesh National Cricket Team.

In the first two editions of Bangladesh Premier League, he played the role of head coach of the Barisal Burners. Recently, he has been appointed assistant coach of Bangladesh National Cricket Team for the India series in June where he will be assisting the newly appointed head Coach Chandika Hathurusingha. He is the coach of Minister Group Rajshahi in Bangabandhu T20 Cup 2020.

References

Living people
Bangladesh Premier League coaches
Bangladeshi cricket coaches
Year of birth missing (living people)
Coaches of the Bangladesh national cricket team